Opharus belus is a moth of the family Erebidae. It was described by Herbert Druce in 1897. It is found in Panama.

References

Opharus
Moths described in 1897
Moths of Central America